The Mistress is a 2012 Filipino romantic melodrama film directed by Olivia Lamasan, starring John Lloyd Cruz and Bea Alonzo with Ms. Hilda Koronel and Ronaldo Valdez.

The film celebrates the 10th anniversary of John Lloyd Cruz and Bea Alonzo's partnership as a love team and also their comeback film after their hit 2010 film entitled Miss You Like Crazy.

The film was well acclaimed and received mixed to positive reviews both from the critics and fans, and sets a box-office record in the Philippine Cinema. It grossed over ₱260 million, becoming the highest grossing non-MMFF film of 2012 and is currently the 16th highest grossing Filipino film of all time. It also won and received six several awards (including the cast and crew) in the 31st Luna Awards and received nominations in 61st FAMAS Awards, Golden Screen Awards, and Star Awards for Movies in 2013 respectively. Due to the film's success, it was screened internationally in selected countries.
  
Alonzo and Cruz also had their TV series entitled A Beautiful Affair that aired in ABS-CBN last October 29, 2012 and ended on January 18, 2013, is also part of their 10th anniversary as love team and the success of The Mistress.

Plot
A young woman is torn between the affections of her two lovers. One is a young bachelor who brings passion into her life. The other is a married old man who has kept her as his mistress for years.

Architect JD (John Lloyd Cruz) has a chip on his shoulder about his businessman father Rico (Ronaldo Valdez) never really accepting him as his son. Seamstress Sari (Bea Alonzo) struggles to take care of her family. The two meet by chance, and JD aggressively pursues Sari's affections. Though the two are clearly a good match, there is a problem standing in the way of their bliss: Sari is the mistress of JD's father. Against his better judgment, JD continues to court Sari even after finding out this difficult fact. He hides his true identity as Rico's son, and fights to win Sari's heart.

Upon their struggles, Rico's wife was angrily dismayed to see Sari, who happens to be his mistress, as both his son JD and himself had a rivalry for Sari's heart. When they travel to the province to deliver their client's Barong Tagalog, both Sari and JD finally show their true feelings for each other as they watch the wedding ceremony. Despite her relationship with JD's father, Sari finally gives in to JD's feelings and both become romantically involved as they make love.

After their travel in the province, they were found by JD's father Rico, who is furious to see his son become close to his mistress. It made both Rico and JD argue, ended up having a fistfight as Sari tried to stop them until Rico suffers from a severe heart attack.

At the hospital, JD finally apologizes to his father, Rico, who is bedridden and dying, and Rico appoints his son as the CEO and president, handing over their family business before he dies.

The two part ways in Rico and Sari's house, their love nest, with heavy hearts because they both know they can only love each other when they pretend.

At the end of the movie after JD delivers his speech to his father's employees about his father's life and his business, people applaud him. Then he comes to pass by the shop, stops and watches Sari as she fixes the formal suit she had sewn in the dress shop. The two see each other, make eye contact and flashback to the scene in Tuguegarao where they pretended and thought about the “what ifs”. Sari saw JD before he drove his car away, smiling at each other.

Cast

 John Lloyd Cruz as Frederico "JD" / "Eric" Torres Jr.
 Bea Alonzo as Rosario "Sari" Alfonso
 Ronaldo Valdez as Frederico "Rico" Torres Sr.
 Hilda Koronel as Regina Torres
 Anita Linda as Lola Lina
 Carmi Martin as Marrion Alfonso
 Clarence Delgado as Mamon
 Tony Mabesa as Maestro Emil
 K Brosas as Rosa
 Minnie Aguilar as Olga
 Gabe Mercado as Mr. Zarate
 Nor Domingo as Brian

 Carla Humphries as Carly
 Al Gaitmatan as Arnold
 Marj Lorico as Julie
 Eileen Gonzales as Abby
 Patrick Moreno as Arvin
 Nina Guirnaldo as Guia
 Jessica Rose Ashton as Lexie
 Dustin Guia as Joey
 Karl Ernest Alano as Aljo
 Joel Molina as Alex

Production

Background
The film was first announced by Star Cinema in April 2012 through the longest running flagship newscast in the Philippines, TV Patrol, now dubbed as "TV Patrol 25." The film was directed by Olivia Lamasan and will be a John Lloyd Cruz and Bea Alonzo comeback-movie after a two years hiatus. Their on-screen partnership, as in films like One More Chance (2007) and Miss You Like Crazy (2010), resumes in "The Mistress". The film also celebrates their joint 10th Anniversary in show business. Described as an "imperfect love story," the film features a more daring and mature Alonzo and Cruz.

Filming
The film was shot on various locations. The Callao Cave in Peñablanca, Cagayan was closed for two days on 8 and 9 June for the shooting of the movie. They also used various locations in the Cagayan province, especially in Tuguegarao City and the Baua Bridge in Gonzaga, Cagayan, while the beach scenes were at the Anguib Beach and "Boracay of the North" in Santa Ana, Cagayan. Release date is 12 September 2012 in theatres nationwide.

Music
The only song that is being played throughout the film is the hit single "Chasing Cars", written and performed by the Irish/Scottish alternative rock band "Snow Patrol".

Release

International screening
Here are some selected international screening dates and venues of The Mistress:

(notes: Please refer to the references links for the exact information for the International Screening of The Mistress)

Reception

Critical response

The Mistress received generally positive reviews.

Philbert Ortiz Dy gave the film 3 out of 5 stars. He stated that The Mistress doesn't do a very good job of exploring what it is to be a mistress. It only depicts a few stolen moments from the adulterous relationship, focusing instead on the budding romance between the two younger characters.[...]The movie isn't as complex as the premise makes it sound. Though it tackles mature subject matter and plays with Oedipal themes, the film is really much more about the love story than it is about the adultery. He also stated that The Mistress can still be quite affecting. Taken away from the larger narrative, the movie is able to build a compelling fantasy that's far more romantic than one would expect and It still makes a compelling case for itself every now and then.

Phillip Cu-Unjieng of The Philippine Star magazine also gave a positive feedback to The Mistress. He states that Star Cinema's The Mistress is a "superb acting vehicle for both Bea Alonzo and John Lloyd Cruz, proving that even when tackling more mature roles, their chemistry, after a full decade, remains intact." And The Mistress has its texture of the screenplay and the sympathetic depth of the characters that make it such an absorbing film.

In a positive response by Maridol Rañoa-Bismark of Yahoo Philippines, The Mistress may be a serious film, but it can make moviegoers break into smiles with snippets of humor and “It’s a suspension of disbelief that will amaze even the most rabid mistress hater.”

Mark Angelo Ching and Jocelyn Dimaculangan of PEP also gave a positive response to the film, they stated that, "This movie casts a sympathetic look at someone who agrees to be a kept woman in exchange for a huge debt. But far from glorifying the mistress, the film delves into the heartwrenching pain brought about by being caught in this four-sided love affair."

Box office
According to Star Cinema's Advertising and Promotions Manager Mico del Rosario, The Mistress earned PHP 25 Million on its first day, beating the box-office record set by the other Star Cinema produced movie last year and currently the 3rd highest-grossing film of all time - The Unkabogable Praybeyt Benjamin starring Vice Ganda which only grossed PHP 23.9 Million on its opening day. On its first week, the film grosses in a range of PHP 120 Million  - PHP 140 Million pesos. It became the fourth 2012 Filipino film to gross over 100 Million Pesos and ranked as the third local movie of 2012 in span of a week. As of September 23, the film grosses PHP 186,729,040, beating the 2012 top grosser, ÜnOfficially Yours, (which stars Angel Locsin and John Lloyd Cruz) that grosses PHP 157,254,200. On its 2nd week of showing, it now holds the #1 spot in the list of top-grossing Filipino film of 2012. As of September 29, 2012 and on its third week, the film grosses over PHP 230 Million, being the third highest grossing Filipino film of all time. As of its third to fourth box-office successor week and October 2, 2012, The film grosses more than PHP 300 Million pesos worldwide (according to Star Cinema), beating with the same genre film No Other Woman (whom stars Anne Curtis, Derek Ramsay, and Cristine Reyes) as the second Filipino highest-grossing films of all time.The Mistress is now the second highest grossing Filipino film of all time and the biggest local box-office hit this year after it remained the top-grossing movie in the Philippines for a second week in a row.

In contrary to the reports by its own distributor, according to Box Office Mojo, the film grossed only PHP 254 Million only on October 7, 2012, still being the third highest-grossing film in the Philippines. As of its 5th and final week of run, the film's total gross is PHP 262,790,300 Million Pesos, almost surpassed No Other Woman with a box-office gross of PHP 278,418,883 Million pesos.

As of 2016, The Mistress ranks 1st in highest-grossing film of 2012, and 16th place in all-time highest grossing local film.

Accolades

References

External links
 
  The Mistress at Box Office Mojo
 
 

2012 films
Star Cinema films
2012 romantic drama films
Philippine romantic drama films
2010s Tagalog-language films
2010s English-language films
Films directed by Olivia Lamasan
2012 multilingual films
Philippine multilingual films